Henry William Spencer, Jr. is a fictional character on the American television dramedy Psych. He is played by American actor Corbin Bernsen.

Fictional biography
A retired police officer, Henry Spencer raised his only son, Shawn, to follow in his footsteps, schooling him in detective work from a young age.  The character is based loosely on series creator Steve Franks' father, a police officer who wanted his son to choose a similar career path.  He would sometimes try to hone Franks' observational skills by asking how many people were wearing hats in a restaurant, a tactic which Henry employs with Shawn in the series pilot.

In the penultimate episode of the second season, "Black and Tan: A Crime of Fashion", Chief Vick set Henry up with her friend, Susan "Sue B.", from the Mayor's office (played by Corbin Bernsen's wife, Amanda Pays).

He's the son of Henry Spencer, Sr., played by Brian Doyle Murray, and followed his father's footsteps in becoming a detective, but does not seem to get along with him, and is estranged from his younger brother, Jack Spencer, played by Steven Weber. In Psych's Guide to Crime Fighting for the Totally Unqualified it's revealed that Shawn's Grandma Emma (Henry's mom) is still alive.

In the 14th episode of the fourth season, "Think Tank", Police Chief Karen Vick offered Henry a job as police liaison between the SBPD and its external divisions (mainly Shawn's psychic detective agency).  Henry initially declined the job offer, preferring retired life but later accepted it in the season four finale, while pursuing the serial killer Mr. Yin.

After solving one of his old cases in the season 6 finale, Henry turns down Chief Vick's offer to rejoin the department as a Detective and that he won't stay on in his current position, to the surprise of Shawn who seems to have finally come to understand and respect his father, saying that he is ready for retirement and that he has lost respect for the badge because his friends had been dirty cops and sabotaged his case years before. After leaving the police station he then goes to the house of a friend who had worked with him at the time of the case to tell him about what the other two friends had done, after Henry discovers that the last friend was involved as well, the old friend then shoots Henry so that knowledge of his involvement won't spread.

It is revealed in the Season Seven premiere that Henry survived the gunshot after undergoing surgery to remove the bullet, though he spent the entirety of the episode in the hospital. In Season Eight, he becomes a professor in criminology and in the series finale, helped Shawn solve his case, and even brought along his class.

Characterization
Actor Corbin Bernsen describes Henry as "a guy who's very, very disciplined.  He always has been disciplined.  He believes order is what gets you through the day … The dynamic of the guy is that, though, his own order torments him and when he breaks his rules it drives him nuts, and he probably takes it out on Shawn."

Henry is disappointed by Shawn's unwillingness to conform to his ideals, and when the series begins the two appear to have been estranged for some time, to the point that Shawn is unaware that Henry has moved back to Santa Barbara.  As the show progresses, the two begin to mend their relationship.

Bernsen says that, with Henry's career now behind him and his wife out of his life (he was divorced in 1992), Shawn is essentially the only family he has left, making him more willing to accept his son despite a lingering disappointment. Although Henry expresses disdain at Shawn's new career as a psychic detective, expressing his deep dislike of both private investigators and psychics, he appears to be secretly proud of his son's investigational skills and saves newspaper articles concerning Shawn's exploits.

Bernsen notes that Shawn is "being everything I [Henry] want him to be, but he's not being it my [Henry's] way," making Shawn's work a source of both pride and frustration.

References

Fictional Santa Barbara Police Department detectives
Psych characters
Television characters introduced in 2006